The Illinois State University College of Business is the business school at  Illinois State University.

The college is divided into five academic departments:
 Accounting
 Finance, Insurance, and Law
 Management and Quantitative Methods
 Marketing
 Master of Business Administration

Campus

The College of Business campus is located in the State Farm Hall of Business in Normal, Illinois. The $28 million facility opened in 2005.

Rankings and accreditations

 The undergraduate program was listed among The Best Undergraduate Business Schools in Bloomsberg Businessweek.
 The college was recognized as one of the Best Business Schools in the 2011 ranking for U.S. News & World Report.
 The graduate program was ranked ninth in Princeton Review's 2013 ranking of best-administered MBA programs. The ranking was a part of The Best 296 Business Schools: 2013 Edition, published by The Princeton Review. Illinois State is the only public university in Illinois listed in the top 10 in any of the categories.
 Illinois State is one of 181 schools to receive both business and accounting accreditation from the Association to Advance Collegiate Schools of Business (AACSB) International. This accreditation is given to high quality and excellence programs that continue to improve undergraduate and graduate business programs.
 Illinois State is one of only 16 universities in the United States that is a full member of the University Sales Center Alliance (USCA).

References

Illinois State University
Business schools in Illinois